Jason Gerald Williams (born December 18, 1974) is a former professional baseball player and an Olympic bronze medalist in baseball. His minor league baseball career spanned from 1997 to 2003. He was born in Baton Rouge, Louisiana.

References 
 Jason Williams at Baseball Reference (minors)
 

1974 births
Living people
Baseball players from Baton Rouge, Louisiana
LSU Tigers baseball players
Baseball players at the 1996 Summer Olympics
Olympic bronze medalists for the United States in baseball
Medalists at the 1996 Summer Olympics
Burlington Bees players
Chattanooga Lookouts players
Indianapolis Indians players
Louisville RiverBats players
Baton Rouge Blue Marlins players
Baton Rouge Riverbats players